Brigadier-General Sir Robert Chaine Alexander McCalmont  (29 August 1881 – 4 November 1953) was a Northern Irish unionist politician and British Army officer.

Macalmont was born in Merrion Square East in Dublin, the son of Colonel and MP James Martin McCalmont, and Mary Caroline Roman. He was educated at Eton College.

In 1900, he joined the Royal Warwickshire Regiment and served in the Second Boer War.

After the death of his father, Robert Macalmont took his father's seat as an Irish Unionist MP in the House of Commons for Antrim East at the 1913 by-election.

He served with the Irish Guards in the First World War, and reached the rank of Brigadier-General. He was appointed a Companion of the Distinguished Service Order in the 1917 New Year Honours and a Commander of the Royal Victorian Order in the 1937 Coronation Honours. He was appointed Honorary Colonel of 48th (South Midland) Divisional Signals, Royal Corps of Signals, on 16 July 1937. He was appointed a Knight Commander of the Royal Victorian Order in 1952.

He died in a Dublin nursing home in 1953, aged 72.

References

External links 

 

1881 births
1953 deaths
Members of the Parliament of the United Kingdom for County Antrim constituencies (1801–1922)
UK MPs 1910–1918
UK MPs 1918–1922
Irish Guards officers
Companions of the Distinguished Service Order
Knights Commander of the Royal Victorian Order
People educated at Eton College
British Army generals of World War I
British Army personnel of the Second Boer War
Irish Unionist Party MPs
Military personnel from Dublin (city)
Royal Warwickshire Fusiliers soldiers